James Bruce Morehead (August 16, 1916 – March 11, 2012) was an American fighter pilot and flying ace of World War II. He flew combat missions over a three-year span of the war with a total of eight aerial victories. He was awarded two Distinguished Service Crosses, a Silver Star, two Distinguished Flying Crosses and sixteen Air Medals

Early life
Morehead was born on August 16, 1916, in Paoli, Oklahoma.

Military career

World War II
At the initial outbreak of hostilities, Morehead was recovering from injuries sustained by a mid air collision. In late December after recovery, he joined pilots and support personnel in San Francisco, aboard the USS President Polk, ordered to be sent to the Philippines, but instead diverted to port in Brisbane, Australia as the Japanese threaten the Dutch East Indies and Australia.  

He destroyed three enemy aircraft on February 25, 1942 and was awarded his first Distinguished Service Cross for that mission. On April 25, 1942, he destroyed two more enemy aircraft, earning him the flying ace status.

During this time he was credited with the destruction of 7 Japanese aircraft in aerial combat. He received the Distinguished Service Cross, Silver Star and Distinguished Flying Cross for his service in the Pacific Theater.

He received a second Distinguished Service Cross and an additional Distinguished Flying Cross for his service in the European Theater.

His aerial victories during World War II consisted of 8 enemy planes destroyed in the air and 1 damaged. Of his kills, 7 were attained while flying P-40 and one was attained while flying P-38.

His book "In my sights" is a candid, honest, brave story of the few who survived the terrible aerial battles against the Zeros in the Southwest Pacific.

Aerial Victory credits

Later life
In 1999 he was inducted into the American Combat Airman Hall of Fame.

Morehead died on March 11, 2012. He is buried with full military honors at Arlington National Cemetery.

Awards and decorations
His awards and decorations include:

References

1916 births
2012 deaths
American World War II flying aces
Aviators from Oklahoma
Recipients of the Air Medal
Recipients of the Distinguished Flying Cross (United States)
Recipients of the Distinguished Service Cross (United States)
Recipients of the Silver Star
United States Army Air Forces pilots of World War II
People from Garvin County, Oklahoma
Military personnel from Oklahoma
United States Air Force personnel of the Korean War
Burials at Arlington National Cemetery
American expatriates in Taiwan
Recipients of the Croix de Guerre 1939–1945 (France)